Angus Small (born 12 August 1968) is a South African cricketer. He played in twelve first-class and three List A matches from 1989/90 to 1995/96.

References

External links
 

1968 births
Living people
South African cricketers
Border cricketers
KwaZulu-Natal cricketers
Cricketers from Durban